Kristy Wu (born October 11, 1982) is a retired American actress, best known for her recurring role as Chao-Ahn in the TV series, Buffy the Vampire Slayer and co-starring as Melissa Wu in Flight 29 Down. Other television credits include guest appearances on Joan of Arcadia, Freaks and Geeks, and Moesha. Her movie appearances include What's Cooking?, Drive Me Crazy, and Cry Wolf. She also co-starred alongside Sara Paxton as one of the Sinister Sisters in the fourth installment in the Disney Channel film series Return to Halloweentown.

Filmography

Film

Television

Video games

References

External links
 

1982 births
21st-century American actresses
Actresses from Los Angeles
American film actresses
American people of Chinese descent
American television actresses
American voice actresses
Living people